Carlos Bello Otero (born 9 August 1966) is a Mexican politician from the National Action Party. He currently serves as a federal deputy, in the LXIII Legislature of the Mexican Congress representing the State of Mexico. He also served in the LXI Legislature.

References

1966 births
Living people
Politicians from Guerrero
National Action Party (Mexico) politicians
21st-century Mexican politicians
Deputies of the LXI Legislature of Mexico
Members of the Chamber of Deputies (Mexico) for the State of Mexico